Djiour Southwest Airport  is a public use airport located near Djiour, Tandjilé, Chad.

See also
List of airports in Chad

References

External links 
 Airport record for Djiour Southwest Airport at Landings.com

Airports in Chad
Tandjilé Region